Jarl Salomein (born 27 January 1989 in Ghent) is a Belgian former professional cyclist, who competed professionally for  between 2011 and 2017.

Major results

2007
 1st Overall Route de l'Avenir
 2nd Road race, National Junior Road Championships
 7th Paris–Roubaix Juniors
2009
 10th Memorial Van Coningsloo
2010
 1st Omloop Het Nieuwsblad U23
 1st Stage 1 Ronde de l'Oise
 2nd Grand Prix Criquielion
 7th Dwars door de Antwerpse Kempen
 8th Paris–Tours Espoirs
 9th Ronde van Vlaanderen U23
 10th Beverbeek Classic
2013
 9th Nationale Sluitingsprijs
2015
 1st  Mountains classification Three Days of De Panne
 5th Omloop van het Waasland
 5th Velothon Berlin
 8th Handzame Classic
 9th Internationale Wielertrofee Jong Maar Moedig
2016
 9th Antwerpse Havenpijl
2017
 8th Internationale Wielertrofee Jong Maar Moedig
 8th Grand Prix de Fourmies
 10th Nationale Sluitingsprijs

References

External links

1989 births
Living people
Belgian male cyclists
Sportspeople from Ghent
Cyclists from East Flanders